Treppo Grande is a comune (municipality) in   the Italian region Friuli-Venezia Giulia, located about  northwest of Trieste and about  northwest of Udine.

Treppo Grande borders the following municipalities: Buja, Cassacco, Colloredo di Monte Albano, Magnano in Riviera, Tricesimo.

References

External links
 Official website

Cities and towns in Friuli-Venezia Giulia